GLIM or Glim may refer to:
 Glim, a neighborhood in Alexandria, Egypt
 GLIM (software) (Generalized Linear Interactive Modelling), a statistical software program for fitting generalized linear models
 Jonas Glim, a DC Comics character
 Glim (or glimmer), a reflective device used for cheating in poker or other card games
 Great Lakes Institute of Management in Chennai, India